Jaali Note is a 1960 Hindi-language crime film directed by Shakti Samanta, based on the theme of counterfeit money. It stars Dev Anand and Madhubala, along with Helen, Madan Puri, Om Prakash.

The film was unsuccessful with critics but emerged as one of the biggest commercial  successes of the year. Its popularity was further escalated by its soundtrack (composed by O. P. Nayyar), of which many songs turned out to be chartbusters.

Plot
Dinesh (Dev Anand) lives a middle-class lifestyle with his mother in Bombay. On his fifth birthday, his father left them never to return.

Now, Inspector Dinesh has grown up, is working for the Criminal Investigations Department, and has been assigned to stop the circulation of fake currency notes. His investigations take him to Sunderdas, who is killed. He then masquerades as social worker Abdul Rashid to try to get some information from a jailed convict, Banwarilal, to no avail. Finally, he dons the disguise of wealthy Kunver Vijay Bahadur, rents a suite in Hotel Paris and befriends Manohar (Madan Puri) and several other gangsters. He gets arrested and lodged in the same cell as Banwarilal. From there, the men break out and join Manohar and the rest of the gang.

It is here that Dinesh will find out the king-pin behind the racket. But before he can do anything, he finds himself confronting his past and will be trapped in an underwater fortress with his sweetheart, press reporter Renu (Madhubala).

Cast
 Dev Anand as C.I.D. Inspector Dinesh / Prince Vijay Bahadur / Abdul Rashid
 Madhubala as Renu / Beena
 Helen as Lily
 Madan Puri as Manohar 
 Om Prakash as C.I.D. Constable Pandu / Nandlal
 Tun Tun as Mrs. Malik
 Bipin Gupta as Rai Bahadur / Boss (Dinesh's Father)
 Mridula Rani as Shobha (Dinesh's Mother)

Soundtrack
All songs are composed by O. P. Nayyar and lyrics are written by Raja Mehdi Ali Khan.

Reception

Critical reception 
Jaali Note was sharply criticised by the critic Karan Bali. Bali referred to the film as "yet another urban crime thriller that Hindi cinema churned out regularly through the 1950s and early '60s." He stated that the film is poorly written and the script lacks realism and logic. The only aspect of the film praised by him was its score by O. P. Nayyar, but here also he found the song's picturisations to be only satisfying.

Box office 
Despite negative reviews, Jaali Note was a big box office success. In Samanta's words, the film "did fairly well" and was financially profitable. The film's music was also well-received by audience. Overall, the year 1960 was an important year in Madhubala's career, as she starred in three back-to-back hits—Mughal-e-Azam, Jaali Note and Barsaat Ki Raat.

Trivia 
 Like in many other films, in this also you can see Dev Anand playing cards in bar.
 The car in which Madhubala is kidnapped and taken to Manohar's den, has old 'J&K' number plate, very rarely seen.

References

External links

Films scored by O. P. Nayyar
1960 films
1960s Hindi-language films
Films directed by Shakti Samanta
Indian black-and-white films